Progressive Unionist may refer to:
Progressive Unionist Party, a Northern Irish party
Vanguard Progressive Unionist Party, a Northern Irish party
Ulster Progressive Unionist Association, a Northern Irish political group